Marcos Ramírez (born 25 April 1983 in Avellaneda) is an Argentine football defender. He currently plays for Defensa y Justicia.

External links
 Argentine Primera statistics

1983 births
Sportspeople from Avellaneda
Argentine footballers
Association football defenders
Defensa y Justicia footballers
Club Atlético Independiente footballers
Club de Gimnasia y Esgrima La Plata footballers
Godoy Cruz Antonio Tomba footballers
Chacarita Juniors footballers
Argentine Primera División players
Living people